TUDN, formerly Televisa Deportes Network (abbr. TDN), is a Mexican television sports channel operated by TelevisaUnivision Mexico through its specialty channels subsidiary TelevisaUnivision Networks. Launched on July 22, 2009, the channel is available on major Mexican multichannel television providers, with the separate Central American feed being also available for providers there.

The channel has ties with the U.S. sports channel of the same name, sharing some of its programming. Before July 20, 2019, when the U.S. counterpart was known as Univision Deportes Network (UDN), the channel was referred to as Univision TDN during these programs. In 2019, it was announced that TDN and UDN would jointly relaunch as TUDN—signifying a greater amount of collaboration between the two channels.

History

In May 2019, it was announced that both Televisa Deportes Network and Univision Deportes Network would be jointly rebranded as TUDN. The new branding is a combination of abbreviations TDN and UDN, but the first two letters are also pronounced as the Spanish adjective "tu" (your), allowing the name to also be read as "Tu deportes network" ("Your sports network"). TUDN will be promoted as a multi-platform brand, and there will be closer collaboration between the Mexican and American channels—allowing for expanded studio programming in the morning and daytime hours (to bolster its expansion into European soccer with its recent acquisition of UEFA rights, and existing content such as Liga MX soccer).

Programming

Soccer 
Liga BBVA
Liga MX 
Zona _ Sports show, where the conductors are fans of a Mexican Sports team. Teams like CD Guadalajara and America.

Baseball 
Major League Baseball

Basketball 
NBA
NCAA March Madness

Billiards 
Matchroom Pool Events
World Pool Championship
World Pool Masters
World Cup of Pool
World 10-ball Championship

American football 
Arena Football

Ice hockey 
CHL
NHL

Golf 
LPGA
PGA Tour

Mixed martial arts and Boxing 
Sabados de Corona
UFC
ONE Fighting Championship

Motor Sports 
 Formula One
 Formula Two
 TC2000 Championship
 TC2000 Series
 Top Race V6
 Top Race Series

Tennis 
Australian Open
French Open
Wimbledon Championships
US Open

Personalities 

  Adolfo Peñaloza
  Adrián Esparza Oteo
  Adriana Monsalve
  Aldo Farías
  Arlene Maciel
  Alberto "Tito" Etcheverry
  Alejandro Berry
  Alejandro de la Rosa
  Alejandro Zenteno
  Alfredo Tame
  Alonso Cabral 
  Ana Caty Hernández
  Antonio de Valdés
  Antonio Gómez Luna
  Antonio Nelli
  Alfredo Ruiz
  Andrés Vaca 
  Benito Archundia
  Axel Solís
  Carla Mondragón
  Carlos Aguilar
  Carlos López Silanes
  Carlos Moreno
  Carlos Pavón
  Carolina Morán
  Carolina Weigend
  César Martínez 
  Christelle Patterson 
  Christian Elguea
  Cristina Romero
    Damián "El Ruso" Zamogilny 
  Daniel Schvartzman
  Diana Ballinas
  Diego Balado 
  Eduardo Camarena 
  Eduardo Luna
  Eduardo Saint Martin
  Eduardo Solano
  Edson Aldana
   Emanuel Villa
  Emilio Fernando Alonso
  Enrique Bermúdez
  Enrique Borja
  Enrique Burak 
  Fernando Jesús Torres
  Félix Fernández
  Félix García 
  Francisco "Kikin" Fonseca
  Francisco "Paco" Villa
  Francisco Javier González
  Gabriela Fernández de Lara
  Gibrán Araige
  Gilberto Adame
  Georgina Holguín
  Georgina "Geo" González
  Guadalupe Flores Peña
  Guillermo Zavala
  Gustavo Torrero 
  Gwénaël Le Divenah
  Hristo Stoichkov
  Hugo Salcedo
  Humberto Valdés
  Ileana Dávila
  Iñaki Álvarez
  Israel Romo
  Iván Zamorano
  Javier Alarcon 
  Jorge García Núñez
  Jorge "La Chiva" Gutiérrez 
  Jorge Nava 
  Jorge Pietrasanta 
  Jorge Sánchez
  José Hernández
  José Juan Aceves
  José Luis López Salido
  Juan Carlos Cartagena
  Juan Carlos Cruz
  Juan Carlos Díaz Murrieta
  Juan Carlos Zarzosa
  Juan Carlos Zamora
  Juan Pablo "El Rojo" Abreu
  Karen Manzano
  Karina Herrera
  Leonardo Riaño
  Leonora Sánchez
  Lili Sánchez
  Lindsay Casinelli
  Luis Martínez-Vento
  Luis Reyes
  Luis Omar Tapia
    Marc Crosas
  Marcelo Balboa
  Marco Cancino
  Marco Antonio Rodríguez
    Mariazel Olle Casals
  Mario Valdez
  María Fernanda Mora
  Mauricio "Mau" Sayún 
  Max Marín
  Miguel Ángel Briseño
  Moisés Muñoz
  Nathalie Juárez
  Néstor de la Torre
  Noél Cardenas 
  Oswaldo Sánchez 
  Paco Méndez
  Pepe Segarra
  Pedro Antonio Flores
  Ramón Aranza
  Ramón Ramírez
  Ramsés Sandoval
  Raúl Alcalá
  Raúl Chazari
  Raúl Méndez 
  Raúl Orvañanos 
  Raúl Pérez 
  Raúl Sarmiento 
  Rebeca Rubio
  Reinaldo Navia
  Rubén "El Pibe" Zamora
  Samuel Reyes
  Sara Zetune
   Sergio Verdirame 
  Valeria Marín
  Víctor González
  Virginia Ramírez
  Vladimir García
  Xavi Sol

See also
 Univision Deportes Network

References

External links
 

Sports television networks
Televisa pay television networks
Television channels and stations established in 2009